Yonai (米内, lit. "rice inside") is a Japanese surname. It may refer to:

 Kami-Yonai Station, a railway station on the Yamada Line in Morioka, Iwate, Japan

People
 Mitsumasa Yonai (1880–1948), 37th Prime Minister of Japan
 Yonai Norimoto, founder of Japanese animation studio Lay-duce